José Rumazo González (Latacunga, August 28, 1904 - 1995) was an Ecuadorian writer, philosopher, and historian.

He is the author of the celebrated poem "Parusia", an epic poem that he began writing in 1956 and consists of 5,600 pages in 7 volumes; it contains close to 240,000 verses, which makes it one of the longest epic poems in human history; it is longer than the Mahabharata by Vyasa, the Ramayana by Valmiki, the Iliad and Odyssey by Homer, and the Aeneid by Virgil.

He served as consul in Seville, Cadiz, Lisbon and Barcelona, and he was ambassador in Honduras, Argentina, Uruguay y Panama. He taught History and Castilian at the Eloy Alfaro Military School, and History and Superior Grammar in the Catholic University of Quito.

He is a member of the Ecuadorian Academy of Language, the Ecuadorian Academy of History, the Academies of History of Bogota and Madrid, the Ecuadorian House of Culture, the Bolivarian Society, and other institutions.

He was awarded the National Order of Merit (Orden Nacional al Mérito) (1976), and the National Prize in Literature "Premio Eugenio Espejo" in 1987.

Works
 Proa, Altamar, Raudal (1949)
 Soledades de la sangre (1950)
 El amor soñado en la muerte (1950)
 Ecos del Silencio (1987)
 La región Amazónica en el siglo XVI (1946)
 Documentos para la historia de la Audiencia de Quito (eight volumes, 1948-1949)
 Andariegos (1956) a novel
 Sevilla de Oro and Leyenda del Cacique Dorado (1948)
 Sendas y encuentros
 Parusía

References
 Rumazo González, José (1904-VVVV)
 JOSE RUMAZO GONZALEZ
 RUMAZO-GONZALEZ, José

Ecuadorian male writers
Ambassadors of Ecuador to Uruguay
Ambassadors of Ecuador to Argentina
Ambassadors of Ecuador to Panama
Ambassadors of Ecuador to Honduras
1904 births
1995 deaths